Elizaveta Ilyinichna Ryadninskaya (born October 31, 2001) is a Russian taekwondo athlete. She won the gold medal at the 2018 Summer Youth Olympics on the Girls 49 kg.

References 

2001 births
Living people
Russian female taekwondo practitioners
Taekwondo practitioners at the 2018 Summer Youth Olympics
Youth Olympic gold medalists for Russia
Martial artists from Moscow
21st-century Russian women